DFG LFA Saarbrücken (is a French-German international gymnasium/collège and lycée (grades 5 to 12) in Saarbrücken, Germany. It is jointly administered by the French education agency AEFE and the local Regionalverband Saarbrücken district.

The school's operation is detailed in the Schwerin Agreement signed by France and Germany in 2002. For instance, the students enter the school into a French or a German branch. They are integrated for the last three years before graduation, during which they are co-taught in both French and German. Students receive marks on a scale from 1 to 10, which differs both from the German and French school marks system.

See also
 DFG / LFA
La Gazette de Berlin
German international schools in France:
 Internationale Deutsche Schule Paris
 DFG / LFA Buc
 Deutsche Schule Toulouse

References

External links

  DFG LFA Saarbrücken

French international schools in Germany
1961 establishments in France
Educational institutions established in 1961
Schools in Saarbrücken
France–Germany relations